The London Dialectical Society was a British professional association that formed in 1867 to encourage debate "of all questions without reserve, but especially those comprised in the domain of ethics, metaphysics, and theology". It is best known for its investigation into and report on the claims of spiritualism.

History

The Society was founded in 1867 under the presidency of John Lubbock. It gathered together highly regarded professional individuals to speak on issues of the day. Many well known speakers started at the Society including Joseph Hiam, the journalist and campaigner. Elizabeth Clarke Wolstenholme Elmy was invited to speak on more than one occasion. 

The Society had a broad remit to all "the most absolute freedom of debate" with no topic excluded from discussion (except on the grounds of "triviality"). It therefore hosted debates on a wide variety of topics, examples of which include 'Over-population and Public Health' (July 1868) at which Charles Bradlaugh and Charles Robert Drysdale both spoke, 'On Marriage' (April 1871) led by Moncure D. Conway, and 'The Philosophy of Secularism' (December 1872) opened by Charles Watts. The format of these sessions was usually that an eminent speaker gave an opening lecture, which was followed by a debate open to all attendees. In 1868–69 the Society published a pamphlet explaining its purpose, history, and rules, as well as a report covering its activities and members in 1866–68.

1871 report

The Society is probably best known for a Committee it formed "to investigate the phenomena alleged to be spiritual manifestations and to report thereon." In January 1869, a committee was appointed that included 33 members. Notable members included Edward William Cox, Charles Maurice Davies, Cromwell Varley, and Alfred Russel Wallace. Skeptics such as Thomas Henry Huxley and George Henry Lewes declined invitation to join the Society.

In 1871 a report by the committee was published. The Society declined to publish the report and it was printed on the responsibility of the committee only.

Six sub-committees had investigated the claims of spiritualism by attending séances and reported their findings. The report was heavily criticised by the scientific community as being of no scientific value. This was due to the fact that half of the committees "saw really nothing" and only the second committee had reported successful "presumably spiritualistic" phenomena. However, this conclusion was criticised as being based on unsupported statements from unreliable witnesses. The report was dismissed by influential newspapers. For example, The Times described the report as "nothing more than a farrago of impotent conclusions, garnished by a mass of the most monstrous rubbish it has ever been our misfortune to sit judgement on."

The fifth committee had investigated the medium Daniel Dunglas Home but "nothing occurred at any of the meetings which could be attributed to supernatural causes."

On the basis of this report, the London Dialectical Society has been described as a precursor to the Society for Psychical Research.

Publications
Report on Spiritualism, of the Committee of the London Dialectical Society (London: Longmans, Green, Reader & Dyer, 1871)

See also

London Spiritualist Alliance
Seybert Commission

References

1867 establishments in the United Kingdom
Debating societies
Paranormal organizations
Spiritualism